LKH may refer to:

 Lakha language (ISO 639-3 code: LKH), a Southern Tibetic language
 Long Akah Airport, Sarawak, Malaysia, IATA code